Cowhig is a surname. Notable people with the surname include:

Gerry Cowhig (1921–1996), American football player
William Cowhig (1887–1964), British gymnast